Lourdes Benería (born 1937) is a Spanish–American economist. She was Professor Emerita at Cornell University's Department of City and Regional Planning. The author and editor of many books and articles, her work has concentrated on topics having to do with labor economics, women's work, the informal economy, Gender and development, Latin American Development and globalization. Before Cornell, she taught at Rutgers University and has given courses in other international centers. She worked at the ILO for two years and has collaborated with other UN organizations, such as UNIFEM and UNDP, and with several NGOs. She obtained her PhD at Columbia University in 1975.

In 1987 she acquired a position at Cornell University as Professor Emerita and taught until 2010. She was also the Director of the Gender and Global Change Program, as well as the Latin American studies Program. Beneria spent her academic year between Ithaca and Barcelona as a senior associate member at the Inter-University Institute for the Study of Women and Gender. Her more recent work focused on the feminization of international migration and the care crisis in Europe.

Beneria's work mainly revolved around development issues and on labor markets. In 2007, she was involved in a study of policies that sought to resolve issues regarding family and labor market work in the European Union, specifically in Spain and Latin America. The purpose of the study was to analyze the evolving policies of the labor market conditions in Europe, that were prevailing in developing countries. She collaborated with a UNFPA project that explored the problems faced within the Latin American region and participated in the virtual International Symposium on Gender and Social Cohesion as well.

Early life 
Lourdes Benería was born in La Vall de Boí, Lleida, Spain.

Education 
Beneria graduated from the University of Barcelona with an undergraduate degree in 1961, a M.Ph. in 1974 and a PhD in economics from Columbia University in 1975.

Notable ideas 
Lourdes Beneria, along with other feminists such as Jean Gardiner, Susan Himmelweit, Jane Humphries, Gita Sen, and Maxine Molyneux are credited with starting the conversation to differentiate Marxism from socialist feminism. This idea proposed that Marxism looks at the relationship of gender inequity to capitalism while socialist feminism examines the ways in which work and labor created systemic forces that reinforced patriarchy and white privilege.

Awards 

 2018 Creu de Sant Jordi, Generalitat de Catalunya, for lifetime achievements.
 2016 Medalla al trabajo Presidente Macià y Placa al trabajo Presidente Macià.
2017 Isabel de Villena Prize, for contributions to feminist work, Comunitat Valenciana.
 2002 Narcis Monturiol Prize, for lifetime contributions to scientific work, Department of Culture of the Catalan Government.
 2000 Recipient of the Cook Award for work on behalf of women, Cornell University.

Publications

Books 
 
 
 
 
 
 
 
 
Beneria, Lourdes; Berik, Gunseli; Floro, Maria S., Gender, Development and Globalization. Economics as if all people mattered, second edition. New York: Routledge 2016.

Chapters in books

Journal articles

See also 
 Feminist economics
 List of feminist economists
 Gita Sen

References

External links
 Benería's Cornell faculty page

1937 births
Columbia Graduate School of Arts and Sciences alumni
Cornell University faculty
Feminist economists
Living people
University of Barcelona alumni
Presidents of the International Association for Feminist Economics